Sports Edition & Entertainment Magazine is a monthly magazine published in the first week of each month in Houston, Texas.

The magazine is distributed throughout the Houston Area and covers Houston sports, such as the Houston Texans, Houston Astros, Houston Rockets, Houston Comets, Houston Dynamo, and Houston Aeros. It also covers outdoors, hunting, fishing, boating, cycling, running, exercise, health and high school sports.

References

External links

Monthly magazines published in the United States
Sports magazines published in the United States
Local interest magazines published in the United States
Magazines published in Texas
Mass media in Houston
Sports in Houston
Magazines with year of establishment missing